Kosad is town and a Municipality in Surat city in the Indian state of Gujarat.

Geography  

Demographics
As of the 2001 Indian census, Kosad had a population of 26,578. Males constitute 52% of the population and females 48%. Kosad has an average literacy rate of 74%, higher than the national average of 59.5%: male literacy is 81%, and female literacy is 63%. In Kosad, 14% of the population is under 6 years of age.

The said Town was included In limits of Surat Municipal Corporation w.e.f 14.02.2006.

Transport

References

See also 
List of tourist attractions in Surat

Suburban area of Surat
Cities and towns in Surat district